Melissa Ramski is a country singer-songwriter from Nashville, Tennessee.  Since 2008 Melissa has been producing commercially available music and films.  She was Awarded "The Best Female Solo" award at the Indie Ville Awards 2015.  She was Awarded "The Artist of The Year" award at the Indie Ville Awards 2017. She was Awarded "Entertainer Of The Year" award at LOZ Radio 2017.

Early life 
Melissa Rachel Ramski was born on March 25, 1991, in Fort Pierce, Florida. She is the daughter of David and Nancy Ramski and has an older sister Mindy.  She was introduced to show-business by chance when her mum took her to have her photo taken at Walmart when she was only 18 months old. The store liked the photo of Ramski in a box so much that Walmart requested to use it for print ads for Walmart Photography across Texas.  From age 5 she started to sing and perform at various events, such as weddings, barbecues, fairs and concerts. On December 3, 2005, Ramski performed for the Wilmore Opry Christmas Show at the Heritage Center near Medicine Lodge, Kansas. The Wilmore Opry is owned by Martina Mcbride's parents.

Career 
In 2008, Ramski performed in a duo act with her sister. The act was known as The Ramskis and the two performed together until 2010. In 2010, Ramski's song "Winter Wonderland" was nominated for the CMA and Grammy award Country/Pop Recording Artist short-list. Ramski also released her first single "Lost In Your Eyes". Ramski released two singles in 2015, she also won the Indie Ville Award for 'Best Female Solo'. In 2017 Ramski signed to a new record label, Nashville Entertainment Weekly Recordings (N.E.W.R].

Ramski has also been actively involved in the film industry. In 2008 Ramski starred as Karis McConnell in "Lost Treasure Trail".  Since then she has been acting lead roles, performing music for animations and helping out with post production on a number of local projects. In 2015 Ramski was nominated for and won "The Best Female Solo" at the Indie Ville Awards.

Filmography

Discography

References

Living people
1991 births
21st-century American singers
People from Nashville, Tennessee
People from Fort Pierce, Florida